Hesperisternia is a genus of sea snails, marine gastropod mollusks in the family Pisaniidae.

Species
Species within the genus Hesperisternia include:
 Hesperisternia elegans (Dall, 1908)
 Hesperisternia grandana (Abbott, 1986)
 Hesperisternia harasewychi (Petuch, 1987)
 Hesperisternia jugosa (C. B. Adams, 1852)
 Hesperisternia karinae (Usticke, 1959)
 Hesperisternia multangulus (Philippi, 1848)
 Hesperisternia panamica (Hertlein & Strong, 1951)
 Hesperisternia shaskyi (Berry, 1959)
 Hesperisternia sulzyckii Petuch & R. F. Myers, 2014
 Hesperisternia vibex (Broderip, 1833)
 † Hesperisternia waltonia J. Gardner, 1944 
Species brought into synonymy
 Hesperisternia itzamnai Watters, 2009: synonym of Engina itzamnai (Watters, 2009) (original combination)
 Hesperisternia lauta (Reeve, 1846): synonym of Engina lauta (Reeve, 1846)

References

Pisaniidae